Jean Pascal vs. Lucian Bute was a boxing light heavyweight Diamond championship fight for the vacant WBC Diamond title which took place on January 18, 2014 at the Bell Centre in Montreal, Quebec, Canada. The bout, originally slated for May 25, 2013, had to be postponed after Bute underwent surgery to remove bone chips in his left hand.

The co-production of Yvon Michel's GYM and Jean Bédard's Interbox promotions and televised via HBO, has trumped a proposed HBO-televised rematch between Jean Pascal and RING and WBC 175-pound champion Chad Dawson that was slated for the same date at Bell Centre in Montreal. Lucian Bute had the right to face Carl Froch in a contractually obligated rematch for the IBF Super Middleweight belt, but passed on that, freeing the Englishman to face Mikkel Kessler.

It was the biggest fight in Canadian history since 1980, when Roberto Durán won a 15-round decision to win the welterweight world title in his first fight against Sugar Ray Leonard at Montreal's Olympic Stadium in front of 46,000 spectators. Bute, who is fighting out of Montreal, versus Pascal was pitting the two biggest draws and most popular fighters in Canadian boxing who are considered huge stars in Quebec. Pascal ended up winning the fight by unanimous decision.

Background

Pascal
Pascal came off a unanimous-decision triumph over Aleksy Kuziemski in December 2012 that helped him to rebound from the unanimous-decision loss to Bernard Hopkins in May 2011.

Bute
Bute came off a unanimous-decision victory over previously unbeaten Denis Grachev in November 2012, which helped him to rebound from last May's fifth-round knockout loss to Froch that dethroned him as titleholder.

Reported fight earnings
Jean Pascal $2,000,000 vs. Lucian Bute $2,000,000

Fight Card

International Broadcasting

Notes

External links
Jean Pascal vs. Lucian Bute Official Fight Card from BoxRec
Groupe Yvon Michel: GYM
Interbox

Boxing matches
2014 in boxing
Boxing in Canada
Sport in Montreal
2014 in Canadian sports
Boxing on HBO
January 2014 sports events in Canada